Sameer Gupta (born July 1, 1976) is a Brooklyn-based jazz percussionist, tabla player, and composer.  He is a co-founder of Brooklyn Raga Massive,  the jazz ensemble The Supplicants and drummer for the Marc Cary Focus Trio.  He has also worked with vidyA, Kosmic Renaissance, Grachan Moncur III, Victor Goines, Vincent Gardner, Sekou Sundiata, Sonny Simmons, Marcus Shelby, Calvin Keys, Richard Howell, Dayna Stephens, and Julian Lage.

The Jazz Observer called his playing kinetic, bass-heavy, and tender.

Discography
 Namaskar (Motéma, 2010), with Marc Cary
 A Circle Has No Beginning (2018)

As sideman
 Focus, Marc Cary (Motéma, 2006)
 Inner Cry Blues, Grachan Moncur III (Lunar Module, 2007)
 Marc Cary and Focus Trio Live 2009 (Motéma, 2010)

References

External links
Official site
Sameer Gupta at Motéma Music
Sameer Gupta at ReverbNation
Sameer Gupta at Le Poisson Rouge
Podcast featuring Sameer Gupta originally broadcast on WKCR 89.9 FM-NY

Jazz percussionists
1976 births
Living people
Tabla players
21st-century drummers
Motéma Music artists